Mary Boone (January 5, 1924 – September 8, 2015) known by her screen name Erlinda Cortes, was a Filipina actress after World War II who later became the favorite leading lady of postwar actor Angelus.

Filmography 
1946 — Angelus [Lvn]
1946 — Ang Prinsipeng Hindi Tumatawa [Lvn]
1947 — Dalawang Anino [SVS]
1947 — Multo ni Yamashita [Palaris]
1947 — Backpay [Lvn]
1947 — Anak-Pawis [Palaris]
1948 — Itanong mo sa Bulaklak [Premiere]
1948 — Callejon [Palaris]
1949 — He Promised to Return [Movietec]
1950 — His Darkest Hour [Lebran]
1950 — The Spell [Lebran]
1950 — American Guerilla in the Philippines [20th Century Fox]
1951 — Sigfredo [Lebran]
1951 — Rosario Cantada [Royal]
1951 — Apoy na Ginatungan [Royal]
1951 — Isinanlang Pag-ibig [Benito Bros]
1951 — Romeo at Julieta [Lebran]
1953 — May Isang Tsuper ng Taxi [Lebran]
1953 — Walang Hanggan'' [Lebran]

References

External links

1924 births
2015 deaths
20th-century Filipino actresses
Filipino film actresses